Anthony Mark Stuart (born 2 January 1970) is a former Australian international cricketer.

Domestic career
After returning to State cricket, a drop in form saw him leave the New South Wales state squad, moving to the Canberra Comets. A lacklustre 1999–2000 season there coincided with the Comets being dropped from the Mercantile Mutual Cup, after which he returned to grade cricket in Sydney.

Coaching career
He is the former coach of the Wellington Firebirds, a New Zealand provincial team.
He is also a former coach of the NSW cricket team in Australia. Stuart is currently the Coaching Development Manager for AFL NSW/ACT.

International career
Stuart played in three One Day Internationals in the 1996–97 Carlton & United One Day triangular series between Australia, Pakistan, and the West Indies.Stuart took eight wickets at an average of 13.62, which included a 5–26 against Pakistan in his third and last ODI in January 1997. This match also resulted in Stuart recording a hat-trick.

References

External links
 

1970 births
Living people
New South Wales cricketers
Australia One Day International cricketers
One Day International hat-trick takers
ACT Comets cricketers
Australian cricket coaches
Australian cricketers
Cricketers from Newcastle, New South Wales
People from the Hunter Region